Sagas of Iceland – The History of the Vikings Volume 1 is a 2005 concept album by German heavy metal band Rebellion about the Icelandic Sagas.

Track listing
"In Memorandum Lindisfarnae" (intro) – 1:45
"Ynglinga Saga" – 7:12
"Sons of the Dragon Slayer" – 4:21
"Ragnhild's Dream" – 4:33
"Harald Harfager" – 6:36
"Eric the Red" – 5:57
"Freedom" – 4:48
"Treason" – 5:28
"Sword in the Storm" – 5:02
"Blood Rains" – 4:27
"Ruling the Waves" – 5:02
"Canute the Great" – 4:03
"Harald Hadrade" – 4:20

All music by Uwe Lulis and Björn Eilen except track 1 (Eilen). All lyrics by Tomi Göttlich except tracks 12 (Eilen and Göttlich) and 13 (Michael Seifert).

Credits
Michael Seifert — lead and backing vocals
Uwe Lulis — guitars and backing vocals
Björn Eilen — guitars and backing vocals
Tomi Göttlich — bass
Gerd Lücking — drums

2005 albums
Rebellion (band) albums
Concept albums
Massacre Records albums